Now known correctly as Archidasyphyllum diacanthoides. Common names in Mapudungun: Trevo and Tayu and in Spanish Palo Santo ('holy tree') and Palo Blanco ('white tree') is a species of tree belonging to the family Asteraceae and endemic to Chile and Argentina.  It occurs from Curico to Chiloe (35 to 42°S) between 200 and 800 m above sea level. It grows in both moist and shaded sites and more open and arid areas.

Description
D. diacanthoides is an evergreen tree or shrub reaching up to 15 m (50 ft) in height with a trunk which can reach a diameter of over 2 m (80 in). The genus Dasyphyllum, to which the species belongs, is unusual in being one of the few genera of Asteraceae to include species which are trees, rather than herbs or shrubs. The soft, thin, brown bark is deeply fissured with longitudinal cracks. The glossy, leathery, leaves, dark green above and paler on the underside and borne alternately, are elliptical in shape with entire margins, and acute apices bearing a single, terminal spine. They are 2–6 cm in length and 1-2.5 cm wide, glabrous on both surfaces and pubescent on the margins, the petioles are 1–4 mm in length.

Provided with two thorns (modified stipules), deciduous at the base of the leaves, the flowers are clustered in inflorescences (terminal Flower heads) resembling the hard, scaly flower heads of the familiar, European wildflowers the knapweeds (also members of the Asteraceae). The flowers are white and hermaphrodite, 5 stamens with the anthers attached. The fruit is a cylindrical achene about 3-3.5 mm long and 1 mm wide, pubescent, reddish pappi 5 mm long.

Etymology 
The genus name Dasyphyllum is a compound of the Greek elements δασύς ( dasus ) 'hairy' and φύλλον ( phyllon ) 'leaf', while the specific name diacanthoides means 'resembling (Greek suffix -ό-εἶδος (o-eidos) ) plants of the genus Diacantha ', the name of which is a compound of the Greek elements δύο ( duo ) 'two' and ἄκανθα ( acantha ) 'thorn' / 'spine'. The scientific name in its entirety thus means 'the hairy-leaved plant resembling the plant bearing spines in pairs'.
[Note: Diacantha is a synonym of the genus Barnadesia -  to which the genus Dasyphyllum is closely related.]

Ornamental use
Despite its inconspicuous flowers, of little ornamental value, the plant is occasionally grown as a street tree in urban areas of Argentina, because of its dense crown of evergreen foliage.

Medicinal use and danger of confusion with Latua

The bark of Dasyphyllum diacanthoides is used in its native Chile as a folk remedy (both topical and oral) for blunt trauma:  Palo santo or Palo blanco (Flotowia diacanthoides) .— It grows from Ñuble to Valdivia.
The bark is used against bruises and blows, either by taking it as an infusion or applying it as external use. It also dissolves warts. When not in flower, however, the plant is easily confused with the highly toxic Solanaceous species Latua pubiflora and this ease of confusion has been responsible for many cases of anticholinergic, tropane alkaloid poisoning by Latua in  the Los Lagos Region of southern Chile to which both plants are native.

One of his [ Philippi's informant Señor Juan Renous's ] woodcutters had suffered a strong blow with the blunt end of his axe and went into the forest to get some bark of tayu for it. He took instead latúe [Latua] and drank a concoction of this poison. He became insane almost immediately and wandered into the mountains. He was found three days later in an unconscious state. Several days were required for his recovery, although he suffered severe headaches for several months.

Chemistry
The unusual Asteraceae subfamily Barnadesioideae, to which the genus Dasyphyllum belongs, has yielded phenolic compounds, flavonoids and triterpenoids.

Gallery

References 

Dasyphyllum
Chilean Matorral
Endemic flora of Chile
Trees of Chile
Trees of Mediterranean climate
Drought-tolerant trees
Trees of mild maritime climate
Medicinal plants
Taxa named by Ángel Lulio Cabrera